"An Ihes Erthi Pio Noris" (Greek: Αν Ειχες Ερθει Πιο Νωρις) is a song by Greek artist, Helena Paparizou. It was released on the album Iparhi Logos as  the last single.

Song information
The song was successful in Greek radios along the video clip was played on MAD TV continually. Helena has performed this track since 2007 to date in all her resident shows in Athens and her tours Arhizei To Partyin 2008 and Fisika Mazi in 2010.

Track listing
 An Ihes Erthi Pio Noris

Music video
Helena is in a metro station singing for her lost love in different metro locations.

References

External links
 Official site

2007 singles
Helena Paparizou songs
Greek-language songs
Pop ballads
2006 songs
Sony BMG singles